Ambrì is a Swiss village in the municipality of Quinto, Leventina District, Canton of Ticino.

Geography 

Ambrì is located in the Leventina Valley, upon the southwestern shore of Ticino river and below the Lepontine Alps, next to the neighboring village of Piotta. Other villages close to Ambrì are Rodi and Fiesso. It is 2 km far from Quinto, 7 from Airolo and 50 from Bellinzona.

Sports 
The village is known throughout Switzerland for being home to National League  (NL) team HC Ambrì-Piotta, that plays in the 6,500-seat Valascia, but is set to move into a new arena by 2021.

Ambrì is also a popular area for hiking.

Transport 
Ambrì also has its own airport, Ambrì Airport. The airport was a military one until 1994. Now it hosts events, flight school and more. But sometimes also domestic passenger flights.

Ambrì is served by the infrequently served Ambrì-Piotta station, on the Gotthard railway.

Weather

See also
Lago Ritom
Ritom funicular

References

External links

Villages in Ticino